Kristall is a Russian space station module.

Kristall may also refer to:
 Minsk Kristall, a Belarusan vodka producer
 Minskaya Kristall, one of the above's brands
Moscow Distillery Crystal, a.k.a. "Kristall"
Kristall Ice Sports Palace, Saratov, Russia

Russian sports teams
BSC Kristall
Kristall Berdsk
Kristall Elektrostal
Kristall Saratov
FC Kristall Dyatkovo
FC Kristall Sergach
FC Kristall Smolensk

See also
Kristal (disambiguation)
 Kristallen